The Great Game is a 2015 French political thriller drama film written and directed by Nicolas Pariser. The film stars Melvil Poupaud, André Dussollier and Clémence Poésy. The film premiered at the Locarno International Film Festival in August 2015. It won the Prix Louis-Delluc for Best First Film in December 2015.

Cast 
 Melvil Poupaud as Pierre Blum
 André Dussollier as Joseph Paskin
 Clémence Poésy as Laura Haydon
 Sophie Cattani as Caroline
 Antoine Chappey as Copeau
 Nathalie Richard as Pauline 
 Thomas Chabrol as Senator Darcy 
 Natasha Andrews as Alice 
 Vincent Deniard as Thomas
 Vanessa Larré as Juliette
 François Orsoni as Louis
 François Marthouret as Gérard
 Lou Chauvain as Lorca
 Bernard Verley as The General
 Audrey Bastien as The girl in the bookstore

References

External links 
 

2015 films
2015 thriller drama films
2010s French-language films
French political thriller films
French thriller drama films
2010s political thriller films
French political drama films
2015 directorial debut films
Louis Delluc Prize winners
2015 drama films
2010s political drama films
2010s French films